The year 1940 was marked by many events that left an imprint on the history of Soviet and Russian Fine Arts.

Events
 February 18 — The Fifth Exhibition of works of Leningrad artists was opened in the halls of the Leningrad Union of Artists.
 March 30 — The Sixth Exhibition of works of Leningrad artists was opened in the halls of the Leningrad Union of Artists.
 In Leningrad was opened the Memorial Apartment of the artist Isaak Brodsky, in which he lived for the past 15 years. It exhibited a collection of paintings and drawings by Russian artists, donated to the Soviet State the artist's family after his death.

Births
 June 7 — Valery Lednev, People's Artist of the RSFSR.

Deaths 
 May 31 — Aleksei Kravchenko, Russian Soviet graphic artist (b. 1889).
 June 5 — Vasily Kozlov, Russian Soviet sculptor (b. 1887).
 December 23 — Filipp Malyavin, Russian Soviet painter (b. 1869).

See also

 List of Russian artists
 List of painters of Leningrad Union of Artists
 Saint Petersburg Union of Artists
 Russian culture
 1940 in the Soviet Union

References

Sources
 5-я Выставка произведений ленинградских художников. Живопись, скульптура, графика. Л., ЛССХ, 1940.
 6-я Выставка произведений ленинградских художников. Живопись, скульптура, графика. Л., ЛССХ, 1940.
 Artists of Peoples of the USSR. Biobibliography Dictionary. Vol. 1. Moscow, Iskusstvo, 1970.
 Artists of Peoples of the USSR. Biobibliography Dictionary. Vol. 2. Moscow, Iskusstvo, 1972.
 Directory of Members of Union of Artists of USSR. Volume 1,2. Moscow, Soviet Artist Edition, 1979.
 Directory of Members of the Leningrad branch of the Union of Artists of Russian Federation. Leningrad, Khudozhnik RSFSR, 1980.
 Artists of Peoples of the USSR. Biobibliography Dictionary. Vol. 4 Book 1. Moscow, Iskusstvo, 1983.
 Directory of Members of the Leningrad branch of the Union of Artists of Russian Federation. Leningrad, Khudozhnik RSFSR, 1987.
 Персональные и групповые выставки советских художников. 1917-1947 гг. М., Советский художник, 1989.
 Artists of peoples of the USSR. Biobibliography Dictionary. Vol. 4 Book 2. Saint Petersburg: Academic project humanitarian agency, 1995.
 Link of Times: 1932 – 1997. Artists – Members of Saint Petersburg Union of Artists of Russia. Exhibition catalogue. Saint Petersburg, Manezh Central Exhibition Hall, 1997.
 Matthew C. Bown. Dictionary of 20th Century Russian and Soviet Painters 1900-1980s. London, Izomar, 1998.
 Vern G. Swanson. Soviet Impressionism. – Woodbridge, England: Antique Collectors' Club, 2001.
 Sergei V. Ivanov. Unknown Socialist Realism. The Leningrad School. Saint-Petersburg, NP-Print Edition, 2007. , .
 Anniversary Directory graduates of Saint Petersburg State Academic Institute of Painting, Sculpture, and Architecture named after Ilya Repin, Russian Academy of Arts. 1915 – 2005. Saint Petersburg, Pervotsvet Publishing House, 2007.

Art
Soviet Union